Highway Star is a 2007 South Korean musical comedy film starring Cha Tae-hyun as an aspiring rocker who achieves success as a masked trot singer.

A remake of the 1997 Japanese film , Highway Star was a modest hit at the box office, receiving 1,611,192 admissions and earning .

Plot
Bong Dal-ho's ultimate dream is to become a famous rock star. To make a living in his small, rural town, Dal-ho's heavy metal rock band is forced to play trot (country music similar to enka, also known as bbong jjak) in tacky nightclubs. One day, Jang Joon, executive of a shabby record company, sees potential in the seemingly clueless vocalist and promises to make him a star—Dal-ho realizes too late that he's been duped into signing a contract with a label that specializes in trot music.

Jang believes that Dal-ho's talent as a trot singer is in reflecting the melodramatic sentimentality of middle-aged Koreans (the genre's target demographic), but Dal-ho persistently believes that trot music, along with the gaudy costumes and hairstyles and exaggerated stage movements associated with it, is outdated and trite.

So on his televised singing debut as a trot singer, Dal-ho wears a mask out of shame. However, the strange strategy works; his voice rocks the nation and his album sales climb the music charts. His mysterious masked face had only increased the public's curiosity about the new star, doubling his popularity.

As Jang continues to train him, Dal-ho gradually begins to see the beauty of trot, thanks to the help of his colleagues, especially Cha Seo-yeon, an attractive trot singer with a strong passion for music but little talent. Dal-ho realizes that what's important is not which genre he chooses but whether he sings with all his heart. But he also undergoes an identity crisis, wondering if he would remain a star without the mask.

Cast
 Cha Tae-hyun as Bong Dal-ho/Bong Pil 
 Im Chae-moo as Jang Joon 
 Lee So-yeon as Cha Seo-yeon
 Lee Byung-joon as Na Tae-song
 Park Seon-woo as Hae-chul
 Jung Suk-yong as Jo Seung-ho
 Park Young-seo as Hae-chul
 Jung Seong-woo as good looking guy
 Ah Yong-joo as Seo Deuk-nam
 Kim Hyeong-ja as Dal-ho's mother
 Kim Ki-hyeon as Chairman Choi
 Lee Seung-heon as Lee Dae-chil
 Jeong Gi-seop as detective
 Im Se-mi as Chairman Choi's daughter
 Yoo Jung-hyun as music award MC
 Kim Ji-young as bar girl 2
 Lee Ha-eun as bar girl 4
 Seol Ji-yoon as Madam
 Da Eun as university student
 Kim Ik-tae
 Lee Kyung-kyu as vocal trainer (ending scene)

References

External links
 

2007 films
2000s musical comedy films
South Korean musical comedy films
2007 comedy films
2000s South Korean films
2000s Korean-language films